Wes Kremer (born November 27, 1989) is a goofy footed American professional skateboarder. Kremer was named Skater of the Year in 2014 by Thrasher Magazine.

Early life 
Kremer was born in Tokyo while his American parents were living there for work.

Professional skateboarding
He has been a pro since 2013.

Sponsors
Kremer is currently sponsored by SK8MAFIA, DC Shoes, OJ Wheels, Paradox grip, Bronze 56k, and Independent Trucks.

References

American skateboarders
Sportspeople from Tokyo Metropolis
1989 births
Living people